"Body Love" is a song recorded by English singer-songwriter duo Ider for their debut studio album, Emotional Education. It was released on 3 November 2017 as the first single from the album.

Background and composition
"Body Love" was the first song recorded for Emotional Education, in late 2017. Markwick stated that a majority of the track was recorded in her and Somerville's flat in North London.

The song deals with themes of self-doubt, self-acceptance, the end of relationships and loneliness.

Music video
The music video for "Body Love" was released on 5 December 2017. Filmed mainly in Markwick and Somerville's flat, the video is a mix of candid videos of Markwick and Somerville, and sections of Markwick and Somerville singing the song. The video was co-directed by Ider and frequent Ider collaborator Lewis Knaggs.

Live performances
Ider performed "Body Love" live for The Line of Best Fit in December 2017.

Track listing
Digital download
 "Body Love" – 3:41

HOAX Remix
 "Body Love (HOAX Remix)" – 4:00

Credits and personnel
Note: Credits adapted from Tidal metadata.

 Megan Markwick – vocals, percussion
 Lily Somerville – vocals, keyboard
 Alex Parish – production

References

2017 singles
2017 songs
Glassnote Records singles
Ider (band) songs